Palingeniidae is a family of mayflies, members of which are known as spiny-headed burrowing mayflies. These are generally quite large mayflies with more than four longitudinal cross-veins on their wings. Males have short, wide pronotums and the legs are well-developed in both sexes. The cerci (tails) on females are shorter than the body. The nymphs live burrowed in the mud at the bottom of large streams and rivers.

References

Mayflies
Insect families